Eremia Teofil Grigorescu (28 November 1863 – 21 July 1919) was a Romanian artillery general during World War I, and Minister of War in the Constantin Coandă cabinet (October–November 1918).

Early life
Born in 1863 in the village Golășei (Bujor Sat) near Târgu Bujor, in Covurlui County, now Galați County, he studied at the Vasile Alecsandri High School in Galați from 1870 to 1878, and then to the Costache Negruzzi National College in Iași from 1878 to 1881. He then attended for a year the Faculty of  Medicine of the University of Iași, before transferring to the Military School for Infantry and Cavalry in Bucharest.  After graduating in 1884 with the rank of second lieutenant, Grigorescu pursued his studies in France, taking mathematics courses at the Sorbonne. He also attended special artillery and administration courses at the Military School of Saint-Cyr and at the French Ministry of War.

In 1903 he was appointed director of the Artillery section at the War Ministry, and from 1907 to 1910 commander of the Artillery Officer School.

World War I
 
In 1917, during the Romanian Campaign of World War I, Grigorescu was the commander of the Romanian armies in the Battle of Mărășești. It was there that he achieved his greatest success, managing to defeat Imperial German troops led by General August von Mackensen. After the battle, Grigorescu was nicknamed the "hero of Mărășești". His victory was praised in Entente countries, and earned the general a sword sent to him by Yoshihito, the Emperor of Japan. He was also a recipient of the Order of Michael the Brave (the highest military decoration of Romania), 3rd Class in October 1916, and 2nd Class in February 1918, as well as the French Legion of Honour, Grand Officer Class.

Grigorescu died in Bucharest in July 1919 of the Spanish flu. He was initially buried at the Mărășești military cemetery; his remains were later moved to the Mausoleum of Mărășești.  The inscription on his sarcophagus reads: "With the guards at the Gates of Moldavia, who put a stop to the enemy standing as rocks next to me, I wrote in blood on the ridges of Slănic, Oituz, and Cașin: "You cannot pass through here.""

Personal life
While studying in Iași in 1881, he met Elena Arapu, a Mathematics student who later  became the first female graduate of the University of Iași, and pursued a teaching career. The two married on 15 November 1886, and had five children: Traian (1887–1969, who continued in his footsteps and became a general), Romulus, Aurelian, Lucreția, and Margareta. While stationed in Oituz during the war, he met Elena Negropontes, whom he married in 1918 after divorcing his first wife; their son,  (1917–1990), became a noted artist and photographer.

Legacy
A district of Cluj-Napoca is named after him, and so was the village of Umbrărești-Deal between 1933 and 1950. There are also General Eremia Grigorescu streets in Brăila, Bucharest, Cluj-Napoca, Ploiești, and Timișoara. A bust of Grigorescu is displayed in Timișoara.

References

External links

 

1863 births
1919 deaths
People from Târgu Bujor
Costache Negruzzi National College alumni
University of Paris alumni
Romanian Land Forces generals
Romanian Army World War I generals
Romanian Ministers of Defence
Romanian Ministers of Industry and Commerce
Recipients of the Order of Michael the Brave, 2nd class
Recipients of the Order of the Crown (Romania)
Officers of the Order of the Star of Romania
Grand Crosses of the Order of the Star of Romania
Grand Officiers of the Légion d'honneur
Deaths from Spanish flu
Infectious disease deaths in Romania
Romanian expatriates in France